is a junction passenger railway station in the city of Sakura, Chiba Prefecture, Japan, operated by the East Japan Railway Company (JR East).

Lines
Sakura Station is served by the Sōbu Main Line and is 55.3 kilometers from the terminus of the line at Tokyo Station. It is also a terminus of the Narita Line and is 120.5 kilometers from the opposing terminus of the line at Chōshi Station.

Station layout
The station is an elevated station, built over two island platforms. The station has a Midori no Madoguchi staffed ticket office.

Platforms

Notes

History
Sakura Station was opened on July 20, 1894 as a terminal station on the Sōbu Railway Company. A new station building was completed in December 1985. The station was absorbed into the JR East network upon the privatization of the Japanese National Railways (JNR) on April 1, 1987.

Passenger statistics
In fiscal 2019, the station was used by an average of 10,098 passengers daily (boarding passengers only).

Surrounding area
 Chiba Sakura Police Station
 Chiba Inba Government Building

See also
 List of railway stations in Japan

References

External links

Sakura Station information (JR East) 

Railway stations in Japan opened in 1894
Railway stations in Chiba Prefecture
Keisei Main Line
Narita Line
Sakura, Chiba